Free video refers to video content that is free to use for any purpose, or licensed under a free and open license to such an effect, at least for distribution, and at most for modification and commercial usage. This can also apply to graphical animations.

Free video and included media

To be a free video - referring to freedom (as in free software), not to price - a video's entire content must be previously licensed under a free content license. A video is considered legally unfree if any portion of the video was previously licensed under a proprietary license that restricts usage and prevents derivations and commercial usage.

Under this approach, a video cannot be considered free if it includes snippets or whole copies of any text, image, video or audio that has been previously licensed under a proprietary, unfree license. The legal concept of fair use of a third party's music or other content in one's own video work may protect against Digital Millennium Copyright Act takedowns. In the 2015 court case Lenz v. Universal Music Group Inc., the court determined that Universal Music Group should have considered fair use before issuing a take-down. The case focuses on the usage of a song licensed by Universal that was used in a YouTube video of a dancing toddler.

Free video licenses
At the moment, there are no known free content licenses that are specifically designed for video content. Instead, most known free video content is under a Creative Commons license and other, non-media-type-specific free content licenses, or within the public domain as the video's copyright has already expired.

Free video formats
While the discussion on free video is related to an extent to the advocacy for freely-licensed data compression technologies such as Theora for video and Ogg Vorbis for audio (particularly in the 2008 debate on whether to include the two within the WHATWG draft for HTML5 on multimedia), the latter argument is related more to the advocacy of free software.

However, it is arguable that the free software movement stands to gain from the licensing of video and audio in a freely-usable format under a free content license.

Free video on Wikipedia and the Wikimedia Commons
Free video is used extensively on Wikipedia, and is also the exclusive type of video content stored on the Wikimedia Commons. While Wikipedia allows for the uploading of fair use video (only in Ogg Theora format), the Wikimedia Commons strictly forbids the uploading of fair use video or any video containing depiction of symbols or other content that is prior licensed under a proprietary license.

See also
 Free music
 Open content
 Open source film

External links
 Video - Creative Commons
 Creative Commons Movies
 Video Category - Wikimedia Commons

Free content